Brezova Reber pri Dvoru is a settlement in the Municipality of Žužemberk in southeastern Slovenia. It lies in the hills to the east of Dvor in the historical region of Lower Carniola. The municipality is now included in the Southeast Slovenia Statistical Region.

References

External links
Brezova Reber pri Dvoru at Geopedia

Populated places in the Municipality of Žužemberk